Astragalus acmophylloides, the sharp-leaved milkvetch, is a species of milkvetch that is endemic to Erzurum and Artvin provinces. in Turkey. It can be found at pine forest edges at about 1,700 m elevation. It is threatened by dam construction and overgrazing.

References

acmophylloides
Endemic flora of Turkey
Critically endangered plants